The First Take (stylized as THE F1RST TAKE) is a Japanese YouTube channel that invites singers to perform a song recorded in one take.

Concept 
Videos on The First Take are filmed in a studio, alternating between medium and close-up shots of only the performing singer and a microphone, set to a background that's usually white. The footage is recorded in 4K resolution with high quality audio. According to creative director Keisuke Shimizu, singers are asked to treat the filming as a live performance, The Japan Times writer Patrick St. Michel notes that The First Take's success demonstrates a shift in musical preferences in the public, suggesting that "slick, manicured pop is out and authenticity — or at least the veneer of authenticity — is in."

The First Take is a trademark of Sony Music Entertainment Japan.

History 
On November 15, 2019, the channel published its first video featuring "Narratage" by Adieu. On December 6, LISA's performance of "Gurenge" went viral and gained more views than the song's original music video, and is credited with popularizing the channel. Several recordings on the channel are available digitally; notably, Dish's performance of "Neko" peaked at 11th on the Billboard Japan Hot 100 and also placed 28th on the Year-End chart. As of September 2021, 192 videos and 109 individuals or groups have appeared on the channel; four videos have more than 100 million views: "Gurenge", "Neko", "Dry Flower" by Yuuri, and "Yoru ni Kakeru" by Yoasobi.

As a response to a state of emergency due to the COVID-19 pandemic, several videos in 2020 were filmed inside the singer's home and titled "The Home Take". In June 2020, South Korean boy band Stray Kids performed "Slump" (Japanese version) on the channel, becoming the first foreign and Korean artists to appear, and was the first video to be shot remotely. The group appeared again to perform "Mixtape: Oh" in October 2021, marking the first non-Japanese song to perform on the channel.

In February 2022, singer-songwriter Ai performed her song "Aldebaran", becoming the first solo American artist to appear on the channel. The first American group to appear on the channel was Pentatonix in January 2021. On April 1, the channel published its first recording featuring non-human characters, Sesame Street muppets Elmo, Julia, and Cookie Monster, who performed "Ue o Muite Aruko" with Hinatazaka46 members Shiho Katō, Hinano Kamimura, and Mikuni Takahashi. In June, English singer Harry Styles appeared on the 225th episode, performing "Boyfriends". Styles was one the of few Western artists to appear on the channel. In September 2022, Canadian singer Avril Lavigne performed "Complicated" on the channel. In October 2022, singer-songwriter Su Ruiqi (Chinese: 苏芮琪; Korean: 수루이치; Japanese: スー·ルイチー) performed her song "Liao (The Phoenix)", becoming the first solo Chinese artist to appear on the channel. 

In January 2023, Hololive Production member Hoshimachi Suisei, performing her song "Stellar Stellar", became the first virtual youtuber to perform on the channel.

References 

Sony Music Entertainment Japan
Japanese-language YouTube channels
Music-related YouTube channels
YouTube channels launched in 2019
Japanese music industry